Aled Peter de Malmanche (born 11 September 1984 in Palmerston North, New Zealand) is a New Zealand rugby union footballer. He plays at hooker for Stade Français in the Top 14. He signed in 2011 from the Chiefs in Super Rugby and Waikato in the Air New Zealand Cup. He has also played for New Zealand. He can also play as a prop on both sides of the scrum. He was also qualified to play for Wales through his Welsh grandparents, but became ineligible after his All Blacks debut. However, with IOC rules taking precedence for rugby following its inclusion in the 2016 olympics, de Malmanche will be eligible for Wales selection for the 2015 rugby world cup.

De Malmanche was educated at Hamilton Boys' High School and also attended Waikato Institute of Technology. He played club rugby for Hamilton Old Boys. He progressed through age-grade ranks and impressed at provincial rugby level in 2006 for Waikato, winners of the inaugural 2006 Air New Zealand Cup. He made his debut for Waikato in 2005 against North Harbour in Hamilton. He played over 35 games for them and scored three tries. His first Super 14 game was against the Brumbies in the 2007 Super 14 season. He was soon selected into the New Zealand Mǎori team, playing for them in the 2007 Churchill Cup against Canada. His first game for the All Blacks was against Italy in the 2009 mid-year rugby test series.

Aled de Malmanche is a distant 'cousin' of another former All Black, Jules Le Lievre. (In genealogy terminology they 3rd cousins, twice removed). Aled & Jules are  also descendants of the first French settlers to arrive at Akaroa, a town on the east coast of the South Island and 81 kilometers from Christchurch, in 1840, aboard the vessel, Comte de Paris.

They trace their common ancestry to Emeri de Malmanche and his wife Rose Victoire Jerzeau, who arrived in New Zealand with their then surviving family, a daughter (Justine Rose) and a son (Pierre).

Aled is descended from Emeri's & Rose's son, Pierre de Malmanche and his wife, Elizabeth Marguerite Margaret Hamilton.

Also aboard the Comte de Paris was an Etienne Francois Le Lievre who subsequently married Emeri's & Rose's daughter, Justine Rose de Malmanche, from whom Jules Le Lievre is descended.

References

External links
 All Blacks profile

1984 births
Living people
New Zealand rugby union players
Rugby union hookers
Chiefs (rugby union) players
Waikato rugby union players
Stade Français players
New Zealand international rugby union players
Māori All Blacks players
Rugby union players from Palmerston North
People educated at Hamilton Boys' High School
New Zealand expatriate rugby union players
Expatriate rugby union players in France
New Zealand expatriate sportspeople in France